Predrag Kašćelan (Cyrillic: Предраг Кашћелан; born 30 June 1990) is a Montenegrin footballer who plays for Dečić as defender.

Club career
He had a spell alongside cousin Mladen at Russian side Arsenal Tula. In August 2020, he extended his contract with Rudar Pljevlja.

Personal life
Predrag is the cousin of FC Tambov midfielder Mladen Kašćelan.

References

External links
 Profile at Sports.ru
 

1990 births
Living people
Sportspeople from Cetinje
Serbian people of Montenegrin descent
Association football central defenders
Serbian footballers
Serbia youth international footballers
Montenegrin footballers
Montenegro youth international footballers
FK Spartak Subotica players
FK Palić players
FK Bokelj players
Doxa Drama F.C. players
OFK Titograd players
FC Arsenal Tula players
FC Khimik Dzerzhinsk players
Vasalunds IF players
OFK Grbalj players
FK Rudar Pljevlja players
FK Dečić players
Montenegrin Second League players
Montenegrin First League players
Football League (Greece) players
Russian First League players
Ettan Fotboll players
Montenegrin expatriate footballers
Expatriate footballers in Greece
Montenegrin expatriate sportspeople in Greece
Expatriate footballers in Russia
Montenegrin expatriate sportspeople in Russia
Expatriate footballers in Sweden
Montenegrin expatriate sportspeople in Sweden